Ferdinand J. Mondello (November 5, 1906 – March 10, 1992) was an American politician who served in the New York State Assembly from 1961 to 1972.

References

1906 births
1992 deaths
Democratic Party members of the New York State Assembly
Politicians from the Bronx
20th-century American politicians